Tinnoset is a village in the municipality of Notodden in Telemark,  Norway. It is located at the southernmost end of Lake Tinn (Tinnsjå).
Tinnoset Station is the terminus of the Tinnoset Line,  a 30-kilometer (19 mi) long  railway line that went from Tinnoset to the city of Notodden.  At Tinnoset Station were the docks  which from 1909 until 1991, units of  the Tinnsjø railway ferry system connected the Tinnoset Line to the Rjukan Line through the use of a railway ferry service which crossed Lake Tinn.

See also
Mæl Station

References

Villages in Vestfold og Telemark
Notodden